Macaravita is a town and municipality in the Santander Department in northeastern Colombia.

Municipalities of Santander Department